Connor James Marsh (born 20 October 1999 in Bury, Greater Manchester, England) is a television actor.

He would complain when he did not get the lead roles in productions at primary school. He thought it was unacceptable that an ‘actor’ like himself wasn't asked to play the lead role.

He played Lewis Royle, son of Anthony, in the one-off special episode of The Royle Family entitled "The Queen of Sheba" which aired in October 2006. The part was written especially for him and gave him the chance to show off his talent for impressions.

He appeared in an episode of The Innocence Project, which aired on BBC1. He played Daniel Lucas, the son of one of the main characters, Andrew, played by Stephen Graham. Shortly after, he appeared as a main artist in an advertisement for Morrisons supermarket, advertising DVDs for kids on offer over the February half term holidays.

Marsh secured a guest appearance on the BBC1 afternoon soap opera, Doctors, which aired on 9 August 2007. He played the role of Kevin. He also appeared as an extra in the 2008 British documentary-style comedy The Cup, in which he portrayed one of the footballers in the winning team. This combined two of Connor's favourite pastimes, filming and football.

Marsh recorded a government broadcast in London in June this year which is due to be aired on local radio stations around the country from 6 July 2009. The mother in the broadcast is played by Men Behaving Badly actress Caroline Quentin.

Connor will be appearing in episode 2 of the new comedy White Van Man, starring Will Mellor, Clive Mantle and Joanna Page. The episode, "Turf" will air on 22 March on BBC3 at 11pm. Episode one will be shown half an hour earlier.

At the beginning of June 2013, Connor took part in the All Saints Amateur Dramatics society production of "The Sound Of Music" in which he played the part of "Kurt".

References

External links

Living people
English male child actors
1999 births
People from Bury, Greater Manchester
English male television actors